Hugh Pearson (1817–1882) was vicar of Sonning and canon at Windsor.

Hugh Pearson may also refer to:

 Hugh Pearson (Dean of Salisbury) (1776–1856), Anglican priest
 Hugh Pearson (racing driver), American NASCAR driver, see 1975 Los Angeles Times 500

See also 
 
 Pearson (surname)